Randa Jo Haines (born February 20, 1945, in Los Angeles) is a film and television director and producer. Haines started her career as a script supervisor on several low-budget features in the 1970s, including Let's Scare Jessica to Death and The Groove Tube. She is most famous for directing the critically acclaimed feature film Children of a Lesser God (1986), which starred William Hurt and Marlee Matlin, for which Matlin won the 1987 Academy Award as Best Actress, and which was nominated 5 Academy Awards including Academy Award for Best Picture. Haines also won the Silver Bear at the 37th Berlin International Film Festival. In 1989 she was a member of the jury at the 39th Berlin International Film Festival. In 2002 she was a member of the jury at the 24th Moscow International Film Festival.

Haines received a Directors Guild of America Award nomination for the film Children of a Lesser God (1986) and was nominated both for the DGA Award and an Emmy Award in 1984 for the television movie Something About Amelia.

Selected filmography

Films

TV

Awards and nominations

References

External links
 

1945 births
Film producers from California
American television directors
American women film directors
American women television directors
Living people
Film directors from Los Angeles
American women film producers
21st-century American women